Lycée Voltaire may refer to the following schools:

In France:
Lycée Voltaire (Paris) in Paris
 in Orléans

Outside France:
Lycée Franco-Qatarien Voltaire in Qatar